Prauserella aidingensis is a bacterium from the genus Prauserella which has been isolated from Aiding Lake in China.

References

Pseudonocardiales
Bacteria described in 2009